The Lithuania national Baseball5 team represents Lithuania in international Baseball5 competitions.

History
Lithuania participated as hosts in the 2020 Baseball5 European Championship, where they reached the final, but lost to France 0 matches to 2.

As European runner-up, the Lithuanian team qualified to the inaugural Baseball5 World Cup played in Mexico City, where the team participated in the historic first game of tournament, but lost to Mexico 5–3 and 4–2. Lithuania finished the championship 11th with a 2–6 record.

Current roster

Staff

Tournament record

Baseball5 World Cup

Baseball5 European Championship

References

Baseball in Lithuania
National baseball5 teams
Baseball5